Sigurjón Kjartansson (born 20 September 1968) is an Icelandic writer and producer. Co-creator of Katla. Showrunner of Trapped. He is known for his role in the radio duo Tvíhöfði with Jón Gnarr and for his part in the popular Icelandic television sketch comedy Fóstbræður.  He has since written many Icelandic TV series, including Svínasúpan (2004), Stelpurnar (2005–2008) and the drama series Pressa (2007-2012), "Réttur" (2009–2010) Réttur was later picked up by NBC for a US remake. In the years 1988 to 1994, he was active in the Icelandic music scene as vocalist and lead guitarist in the metal band  HAM. In 1992 he wrote the score for the Icelandic cult film Sódóma Reykjavík.

In 2012, Sigurjón joined Icelandic director Baltasar Kormákur in rebranding his company under the name of RVK Studios, where Sigurjón served as Head of Development until the end of 2021. He served as showrunner of the first two seasons of Trapped and Netflix' Katla, co-created by Kjartansson and Kormákur.

Selected filmography

Actor 
 Virgin Mountain (2015) as Mörður
 Fangavaktin (2009) as Olgeir
 Dagvaktin (2008) as Olgeir
 Næturvaktin (2007) as Olgeir
 Svínasúpan (2003) Various Roles
 The Icelandic Dream (2000) as Loser
 Fóstbræður (1997-2001) Various Roles
 Remote Control (1992) as Orri

Writer 
 Black Angels (2008)
 Court (2009–2010)
 Press (2007–2012)
 Ástríður (2009–2013)
 Trapped (2015–2021)
 Katla (2021)

Producer 
 Press
 Black Angels
 Court 
 Hlemmavídeó (2010) (co-producer)
 Hulli (2013)
 Ástríður (2009–2013)
 Trapped (2015–2016)

References

External links

1968 births
Living people
Sigurjon Kjartansson
Sigurjon Kjartansson
Sigurjon Kjartansson
Sigurjon Kjartansson